North Canyon High School (NCHS) is a nationally recognized public high school located in north central Phoenix, Arizona. It features an International Baccalaureate (IB) program.

Construction started in 1989, the campus was designed by Hickman, Schafer & Turley Architects Ltd. of Mesa. The campus opened in the 1991–1992 school year as Paradise Valley High School before PVHS moved into their remodeled school. It became North Canyon starting in the 1993–1994 school year. The first graduating class was the class of 1994

The school's athletics teams are known as the Rattlers, and the school colors are purple and black.

Academics
North Canyon features special programs in academics. In addition to its IB Diploma program, NCHS offers a variety of Advanced Placement classes, and many of its highest-ranking students have grade point averages above 4.0. Students have won a vast array of academic awards spanning from the sciences to literary honors. In the class of 2009, there were ten National Merit semi-finalists at North Canyon. North Canyon's Academic Decathlon team won the State Championship in 1995 and 1999, and placed fourth and fifth respectively in the national competition. In 2007, North Canyon was on Newsweeks list of top schools in the country, placing 837th out of thousands of schools.

Athletics
The North Canyon Rattlers have won several athletics competitions. The Rattlers track and field and cross country teams has consistently done well in their competitions.
In 2003, the girls' track and field team beat their rival Xavier, and won the regional championship.
The Rattlers won the 5A-2 State football title in the 2005/2006 season.
The Rattlers won the region championship in wrestling back-to-back in '08 and '09. 
The Rattlers won the region championship for badminton two years in a row in 07-08 and 08–09.
The Rattlers won region championship for tennis three years in a row, in 06–07, 07–08, and 08–09.
In 2005, the Rattlers won the region championship in track & field.
The Rattlers softball team won the region title in back-to-back years: 2008 and 2009.
In 2010 and 2013, the Rattlers won the cross country district title.
In 2011–2013, the Rattlers won the track and field district title.
In 2015, the Rattlers cross country team won both the men's and the women's varsity district title, as well as the men's junior varsity title, bringing home three out of four district cross country titles.
In 2016, the Rattler girls cross country team won first place at their Sectionals cross country meet, earning them a spot in the Arizona State championship meet.
In 2016–2017, the Rattlers soccer team won the 5A Arizona state championship.
In 2017, the Rattlers track and field team brought home two state titles for the girls and boys team, winning the DII Arizona State Championship for Track & Field.
In 2018 the Rattlers girls track team brought home a 2nd straight girls track and field team state title. 
in 2018 the Rattlers girls cross country team brought home a state runner up. Losing to Flagstaff high school by just a single point. 
in 2019 the Rattlers girls track team brought home a 3rd straight team state title.

Instrumental music
North Canyon's Instrumental Music Department has been led by Dylan Suehiro, a graduate of Indiana University's Jacobs School of Music, since the beginning of the 2013–2014 school year. Featuring marching band, concert band, orchestra, guitar, and percussion classes, the department showcases a well-rounded instrumental music curriculum. Main performances of these ensembles are held four times a year, and many of them are also perform in other venues, including events with schools from around the state.

Marching band
The North Canyon High School Marching Band is known as the "Marching Rattlers." When the school first opened as North Canyon, the name of the ensemble was "The Stars of the North". The marching band's name was changed in 2013 to align with the school's mascot. Averaging around 40 members, the marching band serves two distinct, but related functions: presenting popular music (stand tunes) in performance at assemblies, at athletic events, and around the community; and advancing the art of the field performance, through the exploration of movement, and a blend of classical and modern music. The Marching Rattlers have been featured at the Bully Patrol Squad Assembly at Cactus View Elementary School.

The marching band is an integral part of North Canyon's Instrumental Music Department, and students in the marching band are usually also members of the Concert Band or the String Orchestra. Some students elect to perform on secondary instruments in the marching band, or take on other roles as members of the color guard or percussion section. The Marching Rattlers ended their 2014 season as one of the top 20 division III bands in the state.

Notable alumni

 Jordan Stagmiller, professional soccer player
 Nick Sundberg, professional football player
Austin Jackson, professional football player
Athena Salman, Arizona House of Representatives Minority Whip

References

External links
North Canyon High School main website
North Canyon Choir Website
North Canyon High School Choir Performing "Africa"
North Canyon Instrumental Music

Public high schools in Arizona
International Baccalaureate schools in Arizona
Educational institutions established in 1991
High schools in Phoenix, Arizona
1991 establishments in Arizona